is a bay located in the southern Kantō region of Japan, and spans the coasts of Tokyo, Kanagawa Prefecture, and Chiba Prefecture. Tokyo Bay is connected to the Pacific Ocean by the Uraga Channel. The Tokyo Bay region is both the most populous and largest industrialized area in Japan.

Names
By the Azuchi–Momoyama period (1568–1600) the area had become known as  after the city of Edo. The bay took its present name in modern times, after the Imperial court moved to Edo and renamed the city Tokyo in 1868.

Geography

Tokyo Bay juts prominently into the Kantō Plain. It is surrounded by the Bōsō Peninsula in Chiba Prefecture to the east and the Miura Peninsula in Kanagawa Prefecture to the west. The shore of Tokyo Bay consists of a diluvial plateau and is subject to rapid marine erosion. Sediments on the shore of the bay make for a smooth, continuous shoreline.

Boundaries

In a narrow sense, Tokyo Bay is the area north of the straight line from Cape Kannon on the west of Miura Peninsula to Cape Futtsu on the east Bōsō Peninsula.

In a broader sense, Tokyo Bay includes the Uraga Channel. By this definition the bay opens from an area north of the straight line from Cape Tsurugisaki on the east of Miura Peninsula to Cape Sunosaki on the west of the Boso Peninsula.

Depth
Areas south of Nakanose are significantly deeper moving towards the Pacific Ocean.

Islands
The only natural island in Tokyo Bay is Sarushima at Yokosuka, Kanagawa Prefecture. Sarushima was one of the locations fortified with coastal artillery during the Bakumatsu period and was subsequently incorporated into the Tokyo Bay Fortress during the Meiji period. The Imperial Japanese Navy maintained a degaussing station on the island until the end of World War II. The island is now uninhabited and is a marine park.

Many artificial islands were built as naval fortifications in the Meiji and Taishō periods. After World War II these islands were converted to residential or recreational use. Odaiba, also known as Daiba, was one of six artificial islands constructed in 1853 as a fortification to protect the Tokugawa shogunate at Edo, and was known as the Shinagawa Daiba. After World War II Odaiba was incorporated into Tokyo and redeveloped for commercial and recreational use. Before World War II, Yumenoshima was planned as an airfield (one of the largest in the world at the time), but after the US military expansion of Haneda Airport following World War II, the plan of the airfield fell through. The island briefly opened as a public beach before being repurposed and used as a landfill between 1957 and 1967 to dispose of the large quantities of garbage from the Tokyo Metropolitan Area. The reclaimed land now hosts Yumenoshima Park with numerous recreational facilities. Hakkei Island, formerly Landfill Number 14, was constructed in 1985 and is home to Yokohama Hakkeijima Sea Paradise. Other artificial islands include Heiwa, Katsushima, Shōwa, Keihin, and Higashiōgi islands.

Rivers
Numerous rivers empty into Tokyo Bay, and all provide water for residential and industrial areas along the bay. The Tama and Sumida rivers empty into the bay at Tokyo. The Edo River empties into Tokyo Bay between Tokyo and Chiba Prefecture. The Obitsu and Yōrō rivers empty into the bay in Chiba Prefecture.

Land reclamation
Land reclamation has been carried out along the coast of Tokyo Bay since  the Meiji period. The topography of the shoreline of Tokyo Bay differs greatly from that of the pre-modern period due to ongoing land reclamation projects. Aggregate household waste production is enormous in Greater Tokyo, there is little room for traditional garbage disposal sites; waste is rigorously sorted at the household, much of it is turned into ash and further recycled into bay landfill.

Bridges

The Tokyo Bay Aqua-Line bridge-tunnel crosses Tokyo Bay between Kawasaki and Kisarazu; Tokyo-Wan Ferry also crosses the bay toward the Uraga Channel between Kurihama (in Yokosuka) and Kanaya (in Futtsu on the Chiba side).

Development

Fishing
Tokyo Bay was a historical center of the fishing industry, a source of shellfish, and other aquaculture. These industries decreased with the industrialization of the Tokyo Bay region early in the 20th century, and almost completely ceased with the construction of the Keihin and Keiyō industrial zones directly after World War II.

Ports
A number of Japan's most important ports are located in Tokyo Bay. The Port of Yokohama, the Port of Chiba, the Port of Tokyo, the Port of Kawasaki, the Port of Yokosuka, the Port of Kisarazu, rank not only as the busiest ports in Japan, but also in the Asia-Pacific Region.

Industrial zones
Industrial zones on Tokyo Bay were developed as early as the Meiji era (1868–1912). The Keihin Industrial Zone was built on reclaimed land in Kanagawa Prefecture to the west of Tokyo. This was expanded to the Keiyō Industrial Zone in Chiba Prefecture along the north and east coasts of Tokyo Bay after World War II. The development of the two zones has resulted in the largest industrialized area in Japan. The large-scale industrial zones of the coastal Tokyo region have caused significant air and water pollution.

Military facilities
The Port of Yokosuka contains the naval bases of the Japan Maritime Self-Defense Force and the United States Forces Japan.

History

Perry Expedition
Tokyo Bay was the venue for the Perry Expedition, which involved two separate trips from 1853 to 1854 between the United States and Japan by Commodore Matthew Perry (1794–1858). Perry sailed on his four "Black Ships" into Edo Bay on July 8, 1853, and began negotiations with the Tokugawa shogunate that led to a peace and trade treaty between the United States and Japan in 1854.

World War II
The Japanese Instrument of Surrender at the end of World War II was signed on September 2, 1945, on board , which was anchored at 35° 21′ 17″ N 139° 45′ 36″ E. A flag from one of Commodore Perry's ships was flown in from the Naval Academy Museum and displayed at the ceremony.

See also

 Port of Tokyo
 Uraga Channel
 Miura Peninsula
 Bōsō Peninsula
 Keihin
 Keiyō

References

 
Bays of Japan
Landforms of Tokyo
Tourist attractions in Tokyo
Geography of Yokohama
Landforms of Chiba Prefecture
Tourist attractions in Chiba Prefecture
Landforms of Kanagawa Prefecture
Tourist attractions in Kanagawa Prefecture